Ochrota unicolor is a moth of the subfamily Arctiinae. It was described by Carl Heinrich Hopffer in 1857. It is found in Ethiopia, Kenya, Madagascar, Mozambique, Somalia, South Africa, Zambia and Zimbabwe.

References

Lithosiini
Moths described in 1857
Moths of Sub-Saharan Africa